The Rampuri (रामपूरी चाकू) is an Indian gravity knife of formidable reputation having a single-edged blade roughly  long. Sometimes, it is the switchblade type but there are also step-lock types. The name Rampuri comes from the town of Rampur, Uttar Pradesh. The royal bladesmiths of local Nawabs of Rampur started making knives after the popularization of firearms after the 18th century.

The Rampuri is still in use today as a criminal weapon, by the local Indian Mafia although locally made guns and sophisticated automatic pistols have largely taken their place.

References

Knives
Rampur, Uttar Pradesh
Blade weapons
Crime in Uttar Pradesh
Culture of Uttar Pradesh